North Carolina Highway 123 (NC 123) is a primary state highway in the U.S. state of North Carolina. It serves as the main road through Hookerton and an alternate bypass of Snow Hill, entirely in Greene County.

Route description
NC 123 is a two-lane rural highway that begins at NC 58 in Glenfield Crossroads, and ends at US 13 and US 258 in Lizzie.  from NC 58, it enters the town of Hookerton where it goes north along William Hooker Drive then east on Main Street. Crossing the Contentnea Creek, it continues north to Maury, where it connects with NC 903. After  through mostly farmland country, it reaches Lizzie where it ends.

History
NC 123 was established in 1932 as a new primary spur from US 258/NC 12 in Glenfield Crossroads, to the town of Hookerton. In 1938, it was extended north to NC 102 in Maury. In 1951, it extended northwest to its current northern terminus at US 258 in Lizzie.

Junction list

References

External links

NCRoads.com: N.C. 123

123
Transportation in Greene County, North Carolina